Attonda adspersa is a moth of the family Erebidae first described by Rudolf Felder and Alois Friedrich Rogenhofer in 1874. It is known from the Democratic Republic of the Congo, Kenya, Madagascar, India, Sulawesi, Singapore, Borneo, Sumatra, Java, Bali, New Guinea and the Solomons.

The wingspan of this species is around 29 mm to 32 mm.

Habitats
This species occurs mainly in lowland forests, and rarely in lower mountain forests up to 1000 m.

References

External links
 With images of genitalia.
Altervista.org Illustration from original description

Calpinae
Moths of Asia
Moths described in 1874